Lucarelli is an Italian surname. Notable people with the surname include:

Alessandro Lucarelli (born 1977), Italian footballer
Carlo Lucarelli (born 1960), Italian crime-writer TV presenter, and magazine editor
Carole Lucarelli (born 1972), French former professional tennis player
Cristiano Lucarelli (born 1975), Italian footballer 
Ricardo Lucarelli (born 1992), Brazilian volleyball player
Vittorio Lucarelli (1928–2008),
Robert Lucarelli former Licensed Massage Therapist and amateur boxing coach

See also
Lucarelli, Radda in Chianti, village in the province of Siena, Tuscany, Italy
Estádio Moisés Lucarelli, football stadium located in Campinas, Brazil
Lucatelli

Italian-language surnames